Jang Dong-hyuk (born May 20, 1983) is a South Korean footballer.

He has previously played for Chunnam Dragons and Mokpo City FC in the  N-League.

References

South Korean footballers
Living people
1983 births
K League 1 players
Korea National League players
Association football midfielders
Jeonnam Dragons players